The 2022 Melbourne Cup (known commercially as the 2022 Lexus Melbourne Cup) was the 162nd running of the Melbourne Cup, a prestigious Australian Thoroughbred horse race.

The final field for the race was declared on 29 October 2022. The total prize money for the race was A$8 million, the same as the previous year.

The race was won by Gold Trip, ridden by Mark Zahra and trained by Ciaron Maher & David Eustace.

At least three Melbourne Cup runners were ruled out of the races during failed CT scan, included Caulfield Cup winner Durston.

Field

References

2022 in Australian sport
Melbourne Cup
Melbourne Cup
2020s in Melbourne